PHD finger protein 7 is a protein that in humans is encoded by the PHF7 gene.

Function

Spermatogenesis is a complex process regulated by extracellular and intracellular factors as well as cellular interactions among interstitial cells of the testis, Sertoli cells, and germ cells. This gene is expressed in the testis in Sertoli cells but not germ cells. 

The protein encoded by this gene contains plant homeodomain (PHD) finger domains, also known as leukemia associated protein (LAP) domains, believed to be involved in transcriptional regulation. The protein, which localizes to the nucleus of transfected cells, has been implicated in the transcriptional regulation of spermatogenesis. Alternate splicing results in multiple transcript variants of this gene.

References

Further reading